America's Pregame is an early evening program on Fox Sports 1 hosted by Mike Hill and Molly McGrath. America's Pregame previewed upcoming games along with news and analysis. It aired at 5 p.m. Eastern. The show made its debut on April 7, 2014, replacing Fox Football Daily. America's Pregame was canceled in September 2015.

References

2014 American television series debuts
2015 American television series endings
Fox Sports 1 original programming